Stephen Guy Simmonds is a Swedish recording artist born in  Täby, Sweden, 26 June 1975. Born to a Jamaican father, a musician by profession, and a Swedish mother, he was raised in Sweden, the United States, and Israel.

He studied at Adolf Fredrik's Music School and Södra Latin Music School, both in Stockholm, Sweden. After recording a demo with Swedish producer Peter Cartriers, Simmonds signed record deals with Parlophone/EMI in the UK and Priority Records in the United States. His first album, Alone, was released later that year, and was nominated for five Grammys. Alone was re-mixed and renamed Spirit Tales for his UK and US release. In 1997, Simmonds had his breakthrough with the hit "Tears Never Dry" a duet with Lisa Nilsson that proved his biggest single hit.

Since Alone/Spirit Tales, he has released three more albums: For Father in 2002, This Must Be Ground in 2004 and, after a long hiatus, Anomie in 2010.

In popular culture
In 2003, his song  "Where Is My Love" was used as a soundtrack for the Swedish film Rånarna.
He appeared as a guest singer on Nâdiya' song "Voles tes rêves" (meaning: Steal Your Dreams), which can be found on her 2008 album Électron Libre.
In winter 2009-2010, he appeared in the Swedish TV comedy series Cirkus Möller broadcast on TV4.

Discography

Studio albums

Singles

Other singles (non-charting)
1997: "All the People"
1997: "Alone"
1998: "Now's the Time"
1998: "Get Down"
2000: "I Can't Do That"
2003: "Let Me Touch"
2003: "For Father" (with Dilba)
2004: "Louder"
2010: "Adiyeah (Give People What They Want)"
2010: "Just Love"

References

External links
 Official website
 myspace

Swedish pop singers
1975 births
Living people
21st-century Swedish singers
English-language singers from Sweden